is a soccer game for the Nintendo 64. It was released only in Japan in 1997. The game has officially licensed players from Japan's J-League.

References 

1997 video games
A-Max games
Imagineer games
Japan-exclusive video games
J.League licensed video games
Nintendo 64 games
Nintendo 64-only games
Multiplayer and single-player video games
Video games developed in Japan